The Confédération Interalliée des Officiers de Réserve (CIOR) or Interallied Confederation of Reserve Officers is an association of reserve officers' associations in NATO and beyond. CIOR is sanctioned and formally recognized by NATO through the document MC 0248/2 to assist and advise on reserve affairs, however, it is politically independent. The confederation promotes and organizes advanced training measures, international seminars and working meetings for reserve officers.

Founded in 1948 CIOR now has 34 participating countries and thus represents 1 million reservists. It is the world’s largest military reserve officer organization.

Even before the Second World War there were contacts between the reserve officers' associations of Belgium, France, and the Netherlands. These connections were revived in 1946 after the end of the war. On November 20, 1948, they led to the first congress and the formal establishment of the “Conféderation Interalliée des Officiers de Réserve”. Over time other countries were gradually added: Luxembourg (1952), Denmark (1956), Greece (1956), the United States (1958), Italy (1960), Germany (1961), Great Britain (1963), Canada (1964), Norway (1966), Spain (1992) and Estonia (1999).

Mission of CIOR 
CIOR’s mission is to forge links between reservists and N ATO military authorities; to encourage the establishment and proliferation of ties among Reserve officers from participating countries; and to encourage those nations to offer reservists similar duties, rights, equitable training, and mobilization obligations, while respecting their differences and national traditions.

The CIOR meets at least twice a year – in the summer and winter – and they work through committees that examine issues and provide analysis relating to reserve forces. Typical issues of interest include the contribution of reserve forces to international operations, the re-integration of reservists within their respective communities following deployment abroad, the law of armed conflict, the impact of NATO expansion on the Reserves, and employer support to reservists.

The members of the delegation work before and during the congresses in the CIOR committees Defence Attitudes and Security Issues (DEFSEC), Civil-military co-operation (CIMIC), Strategic Communication (STRATCOM), Military Competitions (MILCOMP), Legal, Outreach, Seminar and the Young Reserve Officers Committee (YROC) with content and technical contributions from their national delegation. The CIOR Language Academy (CLA) promotes language training in the NATO languages English and French, while the winter seminar prepares and conducts security policy seminars on current defence and security policy issues.

In addition to their roles as reserve officers, many individual delegates of CIOR are highly accomplished business and industrial leaders, public servants, and academics. They are therefore in a unique position to contribute to a better understanding of security and defence issues in the population as a whole, as well as bringing civilian expertise and experience to the tasks and challenges facing reserve forces in NATO.

Roles of CIOR 
To be the advocate/voice for the reserves to the NATO Alliance, regularly providing strategic advice to NATO’s Chairman of the Military Committee on reserve issues; and to foster the professional development of reserve officers. To offer advice to NATO on reserve issues: CIOR is a voice for reserve issues to the NATO Alliance and provides advice on the best utilization of reserve forces in a variety of operational settings, in addition to studying and promoting harmonization in the roles, duties and rights of reservists in Allied nations. CIOR also directly contributes to NATO's goals by promoting and enhancing cooperation and interoperability amongst reserve forces within the Alliance and its partners.

To enable NATO transformation: Transformation in NATO means coordinating this effort within an Alliance of 28 sovereign nations, navigating the challenges posed by the diversity of military cultures, languages, geo-political considerations, unique national security concerns, and economic factors. CIOR brings its collective expertise to bear in support of these challenges by bringing nations together, developing important cross-cultural dialogues and providing a forum for collaborative approaches to common problems.

The relationship between CIOR and NATO is fully defined in NATO Military Committee Document (MC) 248/2.

CIOR contribution to NATO 
CIOR assists NATO in Outreach initiatives, fostering peace through dialogue by helping to expand membership in NATO. Active participation in CIOR strengthens national commitment and ties to the NATO Alliance, which in turn provides participating nations an enhanced reputation amongst the Alliance nations.

CIOR contributes directly to NATO goals by promoting and enhancing cooperation and interoperability amongst Reserve Forces within and beyond NATO.

CIOR provides unique, high calibre and cost-effective programs that are of benefit to NATO, bringing visibility to the value of the Reserve component, which improves military preparedness and operational effectiveness.

CIOR is an organization committed to professional development, providing high calibre and cost-effective programs benefiting individual reservists, the participating nations, and NATO. Hence, there has been signed a renewed Memorandum of Understanding in 2019 with the National Reserve Forces Committee (NRFC) of NATO for closer cooperation.

Value of CIOR 
When a country supports CIOR, it is investing in the development of national Reservists and the international Reserve community, as well as contributing to NATO.

Value to individual participants – creating tomorrow’s leaders:

 CIOR enhances officer career development by providing Reservists with joint and international experience, which is otherwise often difficult to obtain.
 CIOR adds a depth of international staff experience that is second to none, helping to develop officers for their future positions.
 The leadership skills of participants are refined through better understanding of international, political, military, economic and cultural issues – none of which can be easily learned without the appropriate experience in an international setting.

Value of CIOR to a ROA/MoD 
 Participation will give ROAs/MoDs direct access to the best practices and lessons learned on critical reserve issues.
 Officers obtain excellent international staff experience at very little cost, in a risk-free international environment.

Structure of CIOR

Defense Attitudes and Security Issues Committee (DEFSEC) 
DEFSEC Committee acts as a think-tank, addressing current security issues at a global level. This also includes issues surrounding reserves in international operations, reserves’ role in homeland defence, employer support, mobilization, peace support, and reserve recruiting. The committee’s research work involves gathering, analysing, and disseminating information for the use of NATO, ministries of defence and other political decision makers. Committee membership adds value to its members, to NATO and to member nations, by transferring knowledge, exchanging ideas and policy initiatives, and benchmarking methodologies.

DEFSEC aims to study defence and security issues in a relevant and results-oriented manner to contribute to the policy development that takes place at the level of NATO’s Military Committee. DEFSEC’s future initiatives will explore innovative ways for the Reserve community to form strategic partnerships with our evolving stakeholders in the corporate and academic world, as well as continuing to develop our relationship with NATO and their respective Ministries of Defence.

Civil Military Cooperation Committee (CIMIC) 
The CIMIC Committee capitalizes on the military and civilian skills held by reserve officers. The Committee concentrates on humanitarian aid missions, aid to civil authorities and communities, and acts as CIOR’s liaison to the Confederation of Interallied Medical Reserve Officers (CIOMR). It provides advice and analysis to the CIOR President concerning CIMIC issues as they affect the Alliance.

The Committee assists with the planning and execution of an (table-top) exercise (CIMEX) held during the Summer Congress.

CIMIC provides an excellent opportunity for young officers to both contribute and to hone their civilian and military skills in an international environment. Most committee members are professionals in the business, industrial, academic, and political fields in their respective countries, and they bring these talents which augment their military expertise, with them.

Membership on this Committee is an outstanding example of a career enhancing opportunity in an international, but safe, joint and combined atmosphere. Committee membership has direct value to member nations’ defence programs through the exchange of ideas and policy initiatives. Membership enhances national security interests by showcasing methodologies of the member countries. Participation provides critical insights and understanding of the various countries’ cultures, directly benefiting the integration of NATO forces.

Strategic Communication Committee (STRATCOM) 
The CIOR STRATCOM Committee is responsible for:

 Effectively promoting awareness, understanding, and the relevance of CIOR to internal and external stakeholders and audiences
 Providing support and assistance in achieving CIOR’s strategic objectives
 Promoting public awareness and understanding of the Reserves
 Promoting public awareness and understanding of NATO
 Exchanging STRATCOM lessons learned and best practices

This committee works to market CIOR to its stakeholders and strategic target audiences. It provides direct Public Affairs support to the Military Skills Competition, Winter Seminar, Summer Symposium, CIOR Language Academy and Summer Congresses. To a lesser degree, the STRATCOM Committee also collects information from the various working bodies of CIOR to maintain an overview of CIOR activities.

The Committee directly coordinates its work and output with the Presidency’s Public Affairs staff and the CIOR event’s host nation’s Public Affairs staff. The STRATCOM Committee conducts outreach to NATO and NFRC. The Committee markets and provides professional public affairs products to NATO, NRFC and member nations’ ministries of defence and reserve associations’ web sites and publications. The committee also maintains Reserve Officer Association media databases.

The STRATCOM Committee is composed of officers with expertise from areas such as journalism, broadcast media, public affairs, public relations, communications, and marketing.

Benefits of serving on the committee include:

 The committee offers members the opportunity to work in an international setting while serving with NATO allies. Members learn the nuances of different cultures and gain experience in communicating with a diverse group of people focused on a single goal.
 The CIOR STRATCOM Committee allows its members to sharpen their skills in writing, editing and media relations. The bulk of the work focuses on writing articles, taking photos and publishing CIOR materials. In some cases, CIOR STRATCOM Committee members will be tasked with media relations work.
 The committee also gives its members the opportunity to develop strategic planning, time management and public speaking skills. It also allows them the opportunity to continue to hone their already strong journalistic writing skills.

Military Competition (MILCOMP) - Program and Committee 
The MILCOMP is an integral part of the yearly Summer Congress. It is designed to test the military skills of Reservists in marksmanship, military navigation, land and water obstacle courses, hand grenade throwing, as well as testing map reading skills, first aid knowledge, and application of the Law of Armed Conflict. More than 180 Reserve Officers from CIOR and guest nations compete in this major event, normally held at a military installation, open to competitors from all ranks, male or female.

This MILCOMP Committee works with the Summer Congress host nation to ensure that this event takes place in accordance with internationally recognized regulations of competition.

The participants receive many benefits: They hone their military and teamwork skills; have an opportunity to work in a safe international environment, which is otherwise very difficult for a Reservist to achieve; and gain an understanding of the many nuances of representing their nation in an international setting.

For many Reserve Officers, CIOR participation is their first uniformed experience outside of their home country, and their first exposure to working in a joint and/or combined environment. The MILCOMP is a competitive and low- risk atmosphere, acclimatizing the participants to working with officers from different cultures and in different languages, outside of official meetings, which is a tremendous growth and career enhancing experience.

Participation allows for exchange of lessons learned and best practices between participating nations’ Reserve personnel in a competitive environment.

Officers with MILCOMP experience possess a more mature view and a broader understanding of international political/military/social/economic/cultural issues, interactions, and inter relationships than their peers, enabling them to convey the ‘big picture” to their subordinates. The enhanced leadership skill gained from MILCOMP experience instils within their subordinates a greater sense of confidence. These officers are better equipped to serve in positions of greater responsibility, with a strategic level grasp of international/coalition matters, particularly with respect to NATO and NATO-affiliated nations. MILCOMP experience readily equips participants above their peers, for service at higher command and staff levels, by providing them with a much better understanding of international matters.

In recent years, many nations, NATO and non-NATO alike, have undergone a transition to volunteer reserve forces from conscripted forces. Participating in the MILCOMP provides one venue for validating new professional development systems and training methodologies.

Legal Committee 
The Legal Committee is the legal “think tank” of CIOR, composed of legally qualified or legally experienced Reserve Officers. Lawyers from all branches of the legal field are represented: judges, attorneys, prosecution officers and university professors. All share a common military background as Reservists from their respective nations. As a result, the Legal Committee represents a unique international legal body of expert professional knowledge covering a wide range of legal aspects.

The Legal Committee is the legal advisory body of CIOR and supports the presidency, council, committees and working groups CIOR and CIOMR. It focuses upon:

 Law of Armed Conflict issues,
 Employee and employer protection,
 Employer, family, and reservist support,
 Mobilization and Demobilization,
 Legal education on and development of international and military law,
 Constitution and By Laws of CIOR, and,
 Support to prospective new member associations.

The Legal Committee provides support to the MILCOMP Law of Armed Conflict (LOAC) competition, which is intended to train and educate military personnel within a realistic scenario to use and observe the legal rules of war (e.g. protection of prisoners, Geneva Convention etc.). The competition has been synchronized with the First Aid Contest (FAC) of CIOMR and is annually executed during the CIOR summer congress. The committee also administers a LOAC test to the Young Reserve Officers (YROs) to check and validate participants’ knowledge of LOAC.

Delegates to the Legal Committee have the rare opportunity to work in a joint and combined international military environment, gaining experience far beyond their national perspective. They gain special knowledge that can be applied to their respective reserve units and their civilian fields. Being involved in the committee’s activities is a valuable career development tool for Reserve Officers.

Outreach Committee 
The Outreach (former Partnership for Peace) Committee establishes links for Partnership for Peace (PfP) member countries (including nations seeking entry into NATO). It has supported the creation of new Reserve Associations, and the creation of new reserve officer organizations in PfP countries since the inception of the PfP program. Since 1994, the committee’s program has successfully introduced the ROAs of the former Warsaw Pact countries into CIOR and assisted selected nations to become full members of NATO and CIOR. The PfP program continues to integrate former neutral countries of Europe, the Balkan Nations, Eastern Europe, and other countries.

NATO’s role has expanded beyond the borders of Europe and is becoming more critical in the world’s current geopolitical climate. National Reserve forces play a consistent, dependable, and important part in carrying out many of NATO’s new missions.

The committee acts as CIOR’s outreach, acting on behalf of the organization to make initial contact with Reserve Associations in non-participating nations. It provides an initial forum in which prospective new affiliates can participate. Participating in the Outreach Committee develops a Committee member’s diplomatic and leadership skills, and provides an opportunity to work in multicultural, multi-linguistic environments.

CIOR Language Academy (CLA) 
It is self-evident that communication among nations is vital to maintaining peaceful relations and that within the context of the Alliance, the greater the level of English and French comprehension and articulation, the greater the effectiveness of Alliance communications.

The primary mission of the Language Academy is to teach English and French as foreign languages (EFL/FFL), by means of reservists instructing reservists of NATO member nations, new Member and Partner nations of Eastern and Central Europe and the Mediterranean Dialogue countries. The Academy offers intensive courses teaching EFL and FFL at three proficiency levels. Courses are designed to develop listening comprehension and pronunciation skills. Conversation practice uses topical discussions in a military context. Learning objectives include expanding the student’s ability to interact intelligibly in a military context, expanding the student’s ability to interact in social situations, ensuring that the student is understood by native speakers with minimal distraction of speech delivery, expanding the student’s ability to understand what the student hears in a military context, participating in group discussions, speaking with increased fluency and minimal hesitation, comprehending short class lectures, comprehending the gist of conversational English and French, expanding vocabulary in both written and spoken form, and improving skill and confidence in speaking and listening in English and French.

As a secondary mission, the Language Academy teaches cultural and military history as a supplement to its language program. The culture/history of the host nation is normally provided by a host nation guest lecturer and portions of the curriculum address CIOR background, philosophy of NATO and PfP as well as the United Nations peacekeeping.

The Academy convenes once annually for a period of two weeks.

Seminar Committee 
The Winter Seminar Committee plans and conducts CIOR’s Winter Seminar. The Seminar was initiated in 1990 to address current vital defence and security issues. Participating in the seminar greatly assists officers’ professional development by providing a unique and challenging exposure to topical issues. Selected delegates from all CIOR nations attend the Seminar which is scheduled immediately prior to or after the Mid-Winter Meeting (MWM). It is conducted with the support of local institutions, usually at a conference centre in Bonn, Germany. Each CIOR participating nation is allocated several vacancies for this event, with the total approximating sixty-five (65) seats.

Seminar themes vary from year to year, depending upon the issues of international affairs that are vital to NATO, its member nations and the PfP nations. The intent under the provisions of the CIOR Constitution and By Laws is to analyse current defence, political and security issues by experts of diverse backgrounds including military officers, diplomats, and academics from various countries. These presentations and panels occur over a period of three days and encompass political, social, economic, cultural, and military issues. The venue allows the member nations to hear the expert speakers and exchange views with them and among the CIOR colleagues.

The seminar has had a wide range of high-ranking speakers over its life span. All speakers provide copies of their presentations for publication in the seminar report that is distributed in a CD to all member nations and posted in the CIOR, NATO and CIOR websites of the member nations.

The seminar’s professional career development, which is unique to NATO, provides outstanding value. Few opportunities exist for reserve component officers to experience such an enlightened atmosphere as is found at this event. There is a non-attribution policy in effect for the duration of the seminar, which promotes vigorous debate. At the conclusion of the seminar, the official delegates travel directly to NATO HQ at Brussels to attend the MWM.

Participating as a member of the Winter Seminar Committee enhances a Reservist’s organizational skills and exposes them to the challenges of making international contacts and hosting an international event.

Young Reserve Officer Committee (YRO)

Workshop/Seminar Program 
The Young Reserve Officers’ program is a very popular, unique educational opportunity for officers aged 30 and below, up to the rank of Captain (Army or service equivalent). The program’s purpose is to provide junior officers an international forum both to inform and in which to debate. A Workshop takes place each summer at the CIOR Summer Congress and includes professional and social events in which junior officers interact with each other and with senior officers from CIOR participating nations, which includes the Reserve Senior Leadership participating in NATO’s National Reserve Forces Committee. Once or twice a year, Seminars, a smaller, more intimate version of the Workshop, are organized regionally to provide nations a lower cost and introductory venue for their young officers.

The program curriculum includes selected briefings from SHAPE, NATO, the NATO School, Non-Governmental Organizations (NGO’s), the European Union (EU) and internationally recognized subject matter experts. Additionally, the Workshop includes a practical exercise and the presentation of a formal paper on a relevant theme based on issues of importance to NATO.

YRO delegates are placed into multinational syndicates, allowing for free flow discussions, which enable the participants to develop close working relationships and an understanding of different national perspectives. The program value lies in the exchange of information, as well as learning compromise and diplomacy.

The principle benefits are:

 Allows junior Reserve officers to work and debate in a structured environment to better understand and appreciate the diversity of their colleagues’ civilian and military processes, traditions, and values.
 An opportunity for young Reserve officers of NATO and NATO partner nations to gain a unique experience and individual perspective of multinational and inter allied Reserve Forces in a structured environment.
 Enhances joint and combined interoperability and professional development, strengthening ties among Alliance countries through personal exchanges between young officers.
 Participants gain an understanding of the spectrum of global geopolitical tensions, interactions, national perceptions, and relationships in an international environment.

As NATO’s role develops with an increasing use of Reserve Forces in multinational operations, the YROW programme offers a set of unique opportunities to facilitate the relationships and understanding required on NATO-led operations that will enhance military capability.

Delegates-at-Large (DAL) Program 
Delegates-at-Large attend CIOR/CIOMR functions to support CIOR and CIOMR activities and the Atlantic Alliance. The DALs stay engaged and up to date in current affairs while continuing to maintain their friendships and sharing camaraderie with other international officers.

Serving and retired Reserve officers and family members, as well as the family members of the official delegates, may be authorized by their respective national associations to attend the Summer Congress as Delegates-at-Large. There is no cost to the Reserve Associations for them to attend, as they pay their own travel expenses and registration fees. At their discretion, they attend some professional development sessions and may participate in the CIOR/CIOMR organized cultural trips.

CIOR benefits from DAL attendance in two ways. Firstly, the DALs broaden the audience, bringing their perspectives to the discussions at hand, and secondly, by increasing attendance, allow CIOR to achieve a greater economies of scale in planning events, contributing to group hotel rates available for the official delegates through quantity discount and augmenting the hotel’s conference amenities.

Many Delegates-at-Large are professionals in the business, industrial, academic, and political fields in their respective countries and have (or have had) extensive and distinguished service careers. They bring these talents with them when attending the Summer Congress. The natural interface that takes place between the official delegates and the Delegates-at-Large from the various participating countries has a very positive affect.

Special briefings are held for the Delegates-at-Large on key defence issues, as well as on CIOR and NATO topics. DAL participation helps to create an informed constituency that can better influence opinions on Reserve matters in their respective countries.

Activities

Professional development 
CIOR is an organization committed to professional development, and it provides a variety of high-calibre and cost-effective programs that benefit individual reservists, their member nations, and NATO as a whole. By raising awareness of contemporary reserve issues and promoting interoperability and cooperation while respecting national traditions, CIOR develops individual reservists to serve national and international interests.

Some of the key opportunities for professional development uniquely available through CIOR include the following:

Military competition 
Over 250 athletes participate in CIOR's military competition each year. Established in 1957, it is an internationally recognized competition that is focused on military skills that truly challenge the leadership and physical robustness of reservists from across NATO and its partners. It is highly relevant to deployed operations as it trains and tests real warrior skills that officers need to master for success on the current battlefield (physical fitness, teamwork, land navigation, marksmanship, combat first aid, and Law of Armed Conflict).

Young Reserve Officers Workshop 
Annually, about 60 reserve officers attend this week-long workshop, concentrating on current defence and security issues that relate to reserve force issues within NATO and its partners. It is designed to be a first international exposure for young officers to colleagues from the alliance and its partners. YROW is an enriching experience for these young officers, who are the future of the alliance, providing them an opportunity to establish professional relationships that often last throughout their careers, and offering a strong foundation on which to build their NATO experience.

CIOR Language Academy 
The CIOR Language Academy teaches English and French as a second language, emphasizing a NATO military lexicon. The students are reserve officers of NATO member nations, new Member and Partner nations of Eastern and Central Europe and the Mediterranean Dialogue countries. Through the Language Academy, students are provided an essential and indispensable tool to carry out international NATO business – the ability to communicate in one of NATO's two official languages. Established in 2000, the Language Academy is growing each year and trains up to 100 students yearly from almost every nation of Eastern and Central Europe.

Winter Seminar 
A Seminar is held for three days immediately preceding the MWM. Each CIOR member country is allocated several seats for this event, with the total approximating sixty-five (65). Seminar themes vary from year to year, depending upon the state of international affairs. The intent is to provide up to date information on the chosen theme via a series of briefings and presentations by military officers, diplomats, and academics from various countries. These presentations and panels encompass political, social, economic, cultural, and military issues. The Seminar Committee is the subject of a separate fact sheet.

CIMIC Exercise 
The CIMIC Committee hosts an annual table-top Civil-Military Exercise (CIMEX) prior to the CIOR Summer Congress every year and in 2018 the CIMEX was added into the NATO Military & Training Education Program (MTEP). During CIMEX 2020, there was another first for CIOR, as the 2020 CIOR CIMEX for the first time was run both online and physically. The overriding principles of CIMEX are: Demonstrating civil-military liaison skills; Collaboration and Information-sharing on emerging NATO challenges; Promoting best practices and professional development within in the CIMIC community. The exercise is tailored for approximately 50 participants each year.

CIOR/CIOMR Mid-Winter Meeting (MWM) 
Usually held in February at NATO Headquarters. The meeting starts with presentations by the CIOR/CIOMR International Presidencies outlining their organizations’ updated priorities, tasks, and plans, plus any additional information relating to the agenda for the meeting. Presentations are usually given by officials from NATO and SHAPE (Supreme Headquarters Allied Powers Europe), as well as from the Chair of NATO’s NRFC, which provide guidance to the delegates and information on the current state of affairs of these organizations and the implications for the Alliance.

The CIOR Committees and CIOMR meet to work on tasks assigned by the Presidency and the Council. At the end of the week a closing formal dinner is held on the final evening. These activities offer networking opportunities for all delegates. The MWM closes with a final general session to review the work that has been done and to plan for the future.

The CIOR/CIOMR Summer Congress 
A CIOR affiliate hosts this event in their nation on a rotating basis, usually in July or August. A one-and–a-half day symposium on reserve issues is held during the Congress on topical issues of relevance to Reservists from all nations. The Symposium attracts speakers at the highest political, military, and academic levels. The speakers address issues such as mobilization and Reserve readiness, demobilization, and repatriation of Reservists to their home countries and civilian jobs, and appropriate utilization of civilian specialists for peace support operations. The professional development value of these sessions cannot be overstated. The Young Reserve Officers Workshop (YROW) participants also attend the Symposium as part of their program to enhance their career development.

Concurrent with the official meetings, there are events for Delegates-at-Large during the day, although they are also encouraged to attend the professional development sessions.

In Between Meetings 
Additionally, 2–3 days of executive planning meetings are also held in the Fall and Spring of the year. Attendance is at the discretion of the International President and usually involves Vice Presidents, Assistant Secretaries General, International Committee Chairs, Presidency staff and selected others by invitation.

Notable members 
 Lt Col HRH Prince Peter of Greece – CIOR president from 1962 to 1964

List of successive presidents since 1948

References

External links 
 

Military-related organizations
Organizations related to NATO
Reserve forces